Fonoifua is an island in Tonga.

History 
Fonoifua was heavily affected by the 2022 Hunga Tonga–Hunga Ha'apai eruption and tsunami. The Guardian and ITV News reported that all structures on the island were destroyed except for two houses.

Demographics 
At the 2021 census the island had 69 inhabitants.

References 

Islands of Tonga